Sriram Rajagopal Ramaswamy FRS (born 10 November 1957) is a professor at the Indian Institute of Science, Bangalore and was on leave (2012–16) as Director of the Tata Institute of Fundamental Research (TIFR) Centre for Interdisciplinary Sciences in Hyderabad.

Education
Ramaswamy completed high school at the Modern School, Barakhamba Road, New Delhi, and then moved to the University of Maryland where he was awarded a Bachelor of Science degree in Physics with high honours in 1977. He completed his PhD in theoretical physics at the University of Chicago, graduating in 1983. He completed postdoctoral research at the University of Pennsylvania.

Research
Ramaswamy is a theoretician whose research investigates nonequilibrium statistical physics, soft matter, condensed matter physics and biological physics. His research helped found the field of active matter, which studies the motility and related collective behaviour of objects that convert local energy input into autonomous motion.

He is widely known for formulating the hydrodynamic equations governing the alignment, flow, mechanics and statistical properties of suspensions of self-propelled creatures, on scales from a cell to the ocean. Key predictions—that macroscopically aligned flocks of swimming bacteria are impossible, and that the addition of swimmers to a fluid can make the viscosity arbitrarily small—have been confirmed in recent experiments. His insight into nonliving imitations of self-propulsion has led to design principles for chemotactic colloids, the first experiments observing giant number fluctuations in flocks, and the creation of flocks with a tiny minority of motile constituents.

Awards and honours
Among the awards he has received for his research are the Shanti Swarup Bhatnagar Prize for Science and Technology in 2000 and the Infosys Prize for Physical Sciences in 2011. He also served on the Physical Sciences jury for the Infosys Prize in 2014. He was elected a Fellow of the Royal Society (FRS) in 2016.

He was awarded one of the H K Firodia awards for 2016.

References

Living people
Fellows of the Royal Society
1957 births
American people of Indian descent
Indian theoretical physicists
21st-century American physicists
20th-century Indian physicists
Fellows of the American Physical Society